Events from the year 1971 in Scotland.

Incumbents 

 Secretary of State for Scotland and Keeper of the Great Seal – Gordon Campbell

Law officers 
 Lord Advocate – Norman Wylie
 Solicitor General for Scotland – David Brand

Judiciary 
 Lord President of the Court of Session and Lord Justice General – Lord Clyde
 Lord Justice Clerk – Lord Grant
 Chairman of the Scottish Land Court – Lord Birsay

Events 
 2 January – 1971 Ibrox disaster: a stairway crush at the Rangers vs. Celtic football match at Ibrox Stadium in Glasgow kills 66 and leaves many more injured.
 10 March – 1971 Scottish soldiers' killings: three young off-duty Royal Highland Fusiliers are lured from a bar in Belfast and shot by the Provisional Irish Republican Army in The Troubles in Northern Ireland.
 23 May – "The Unknown Bairn": The drowned body of a young boy is found washed up onshore at Tayport; he is never identified. 
 25 May – production begins at the Invergordon aluminium works.
 15 June – Upper Clyde Shipbuilders enters liquidation.
 2 July
 Royal Scots Dragoon Guards formed as the senior Scottish regiment of the British Army at Holyrood, Edinburgh, by amalgamation of the Royal Scots Greys and 3rd Carabiniers.
 Erskine Bridge opened over the River Clyde.
 30 July – Upper Clyde Shipbuilders workers begin to take control of the shipyards in a work-in under the leadership of Jimmy Reid.
 c. August – Kyle of Tongue Bridge and causeway opened, replacing a ferry.
 16 September – Stirling and Falkirk by-election: Labour retains the seat but the Scottish National Party takes second place with a surge of 20% in their support.
 21 October – Clarkston explosion: a gas explosion in Clarkston, East Renfrewshire kills at least twenty people.
 22 November – Cairngorm Plateau disaster: Five children and one adult on an expedition die of exposure in the Highlands.
 2 December – last resident families leave the island of Scarp.
 Expansion of Erskine as a planned community begins.
 Spey Bridge at Aviemore opened.
 Tom Farmer opens the first Kwik Fit car servicing centre, in Edinburgh.

Births 
 21 January – Alan McManus, snooker player
 23 March
 Kate Dickie, actress
 Gail Porter, television presenter and model
 27 March – David Coulthard, racing driver
 31 March – Ewan McGregor, actor
 1 April – Karen Dunbar, comedian
 5 April – Charles Cumming, espionage novelist
 18 April – David Tennant, actor
 31 July – Craig MacLean, track cyclist
 19 August – Paul McGrillen, footballer (suicide 2009)
 30 August – Julian Smith, Conservative politician
 6 October – Brian Conaghan, young adult fiction writer
 7 October – Aasmah Mir, journalist and presenter
 8 October – Michelle Mone, entrepreneur
 13 November – Alberto Costa, Conservative politician

Deaths 
 16 June – John Reith, 1st Baron Reith, broadcasting executive (born 1889)
 25 June – John Boyd Orr, physician and biologist, recipient of the Nobel Peace Prize (born 1880)
 28 August – Edith Hughes, architect (born 1888)
 12 December
 Torrance Gillick, Rangers F.C. winger (born 1915)
 Alan Morton, Rangers outside left (born 1893)
 22 December – D. Alan Stevenson, lighthouse engineer and philatelist (born 1891)

The arts
 26 March – BBC Scotland television begins a serialisation of Lewis Grassic Gibbon's Sunset Song, starring Vivien Heilbron.
 18 November – Stewart Conn's play The Burning, concerning King James VI of Scotland, premieres.
 Douglas Hurd and Andrew Osmond's political thriller Scotch on the Rocks, concerning a terrorist group fighting for Scottish independence in the near future, is published by Collins.
 English composer Peter Maxwell Davies settles in Orkney, initially on Hoy.

See also 
 1971 in Northern Ireland

References 

 
Scotland
Years of the 20th century in Scotland
1970s in Scotland